Christoper Hendricks is an American attorney and politician serving as a member of the Massachusetts House of Representatives, representing Acushnet and New Bedford in the 11th Bristol District.

Education 
After attending New Bedford High School, Hendricks earned a Bachelor of Arts from Temple University and Juris Doctor from the University of Massachusetts School of Law.

Career 
Hendricks' legal practice focuses on worker compensation claims and labor rights.

Hendricks has been serving since 2018 and is a member of the Democratic Party. Hendricks serves on the House Committee on Redistricting, Joint Committee on Housing, Joint Committee on the Judiciary, and the Joint Committee on Veterans and Federal Affairs.

He also serves on the Gateway Cities Caucus and the Portuguese-American Caucus.

See also
 2019–2020 Massachusetts legislature
 2021–2022 Massachusetts legislature

References

Living people
Year of birth missing (living people)
Democratic Party members of the Massachusetts House of Representatives
Temple University alumni
University of Massachusetts alumni
21st-century American politicians